The Story of Science: Power, Proof and Passion is a 2010 BBC documentary on the history of science presented by Michael Mosley.

Episodes

External links 
 
 

2010 British television series debuts
2010 British television series endings
BBC television documentaries about science
BBC television documentaries about history
Historical television series
British documentary films
Documentary films about the history of science
English-language television shows
2010s British documentary television series